Family separation is the condition where family members are involuntarily separated from each other, often because of immigration systems, although it can happen for other reasons such as military service or involuntary adoption. Family separation can have a serious impact on mental health. Because family separation interferes with the right to family life, family reunification is a reason for immigration in many countries.

See also
Trump administration family separation policy
Child displacement
Stolen Generations
American Indian boarding schools

References

Family disruption
Human rights
Immigration